Happy Hour: The Collection was a 2011 compilation album by English indie rock band The Housemartins.

Track listing

The album was released without the permission of Paul Heaton or Norman Cook and was described by Heaton as an absolute sham. 
 Happy Hour
 Caravan of Love
 Build
 Me and the Farmer
 Think for a Minute
 Flag Day
 Bow Down
 There Is Always Something There to Remind Me
 We're Not Deep
 I Can't Put My Finger on It
 I Smell Winter
 Johannesburg
 Get Up Off Our Knees
 Rap Around the Clock
 Pirate Aggro
 He Ain't Heavy, He's My Brother
 Step Outside
 You've Got a Friend
 The People Who Grinned Themselves to Death
 Lean on Me

References

The Housemartins compilation albums
2011 compilation albums
Mercury Records compilation albums